Watab is an unincorporated community in Watab Township, Benton County, Minnesota, United States.  The community is located near the junction of River Road and 75th Street.  Nearby places include Sauk Rapids, Sartell, and Rice.

References

Unincorporated communities in Benton County, Minnesota
Unincorporated communities in Minnesota